1788 Kiess, provisional designation , is a carbonaceous Themistian asteroid from the outer region of the asteroid belt, approximately 20 kilometers in diameter. It was discovered on 25 July 1952, by the Indiana Asteroid Program at the U.S. Goethe Link Observatory near Brooklyn, Indiana, United States, and later named after astronomer Carl Kiess.

Orbit and classification 

The C-type asteroid is a member of the Themis family, a dynamical family of outer-belt asteroids with nearly coplanar ecliptical orbits. The asteroid orbits the Sun in the outer main-belt at a distance of 2.6–3.6 AU once every 5 years and 6 months (2,010 days). Its orbit has an eccentricity of 0.15 and an inclination of 1° with respect to the ecliptic. Its observation arc begins with its official discovery observation.

Physical characteristics

Rotation period 

In 2010, two rotational lightcurves were obtained from photometric observations at the Palomar Transient Factory in California. Lightcurve analysis gave a rotation period of 12 and 11.0335 hours with a brightness variation of 0.25 and 0.30 magnitude, respectively.

Diameter and albedo 

According to the survey carried out by NASA's Wide-field Infrared Survey Explorer with its subsequent NEOWISE mission, Kiess measures 20.99 kilometers in diameter, and its surface has an albedo of 0.07. The Collaborative Asteroid Lightcurve Link assumes an albedo of 0.08 and calculates a diameter of 19.59 kilometers with an absolute magnitude of 11.9.

Naming 

This minor planet was named for American astronomer Carl C. Kiess (1887–1967), a graduate of Indiana University, who made distinguished contributions both in astronomy and spectroscopy at the U.S. National Bureau of Standards where he worked for over 40 years. The official  was published by the Minor Planet Center on 15 June 1973. Kiess was also a member of several eclipse expeditions. The lunar crater Kiess was named in his honour.

References

External links 
 Asteroid Lightcurve Database (LCDB), query form (info )
 Dictionary of Minor Planet Names, Google books
 Asteroids and comets rotation curves, CdR – Observatoire de Genève, Raoul Behrend
 Discovery Circumstances: Numbered Minor Planets (1)-(5000) – Minor Planet Center
 
 

001788
001788
Named minor planets
19520725